Moonlit Winter is a 2019 South Korean film directed by Lim Dae-hyung. It stars Kim Hee-ae. It had its world premiere as the closing film for the 24th Busan International Film Festival.

Plot
In winter, a mother (Kim Hee-ae) and her daughter (Kim So-hye) live together alone. The daughter, a high school student, accidentally reads a letter to her mother and finds out the secret her mother has been hiding all her life. Although it's too late, the daughter wants to comfort her mother's heart now. So the beautiful journey of the mother and the daughter begins. In Otaru, a quiet village with white snow, the mother and the daughter take the path of reconciliation, while building up exciting memories. The mother's unfulfilled past love and the daughter's new love are lying there. And there is someone who greets them. That mournful ‘someone’ who has lost her father and is living with her aunt is the secret character who will revitalize the life of the mother and the daughter.

Cast
 Kim Hee-ae as Yoon-hee
 Yūko Nakamura as Jun
 Kim So-hye as Sae-bom
 Sung Yu-bin as Kyung-soo
 Hana Kino as Masako

Accolades

References

External links 
 

 

2019 films
2010s Korean-language films
South Korean LGBT-related films
2019 LGBT-related films
LGBT-related drama films
Little Big Pictures films
Films set in Otaru
2010s South Korean films